Burrington railway station served the village of Burrington, North Somerset, England, from 1901 to 1950 on the Wrington Vale Light Railway.

History 
The station was opened on 4 December 1901 by the Great Western Railway. It closed to passengers on 14 September 1931 and closed to goods on 1 November 1950.

References 

Former Great Western Railway stations
Railway stations in Great Britain opened in 1901
Railway stations in Great Britain closed in 1931
1901 establishments in England
1950 disestablishments in England